HSG Bensheim/Auerbach is a German women's handball team from Bensheim, that competes in the HBF.

Honours
2. Bundesliga:
Winner: 2019

Team

Current squad
Squad for the 2022-23 season

Goalkeepers
 16  Vanessa Fehr
 36  Helen van Beurden
Wings
RW
 3  Amelie Berger
 7  Lotta Heider
 10  Jan Haas
 11  Sarah Dekker
LW
 9  Elisa Stuttfeld
 15  Ndidi Agwunedu
Pivot
 5  Isabell Hurst
 96  Dionne Visser

Back players
LB
 8  Myrthe Schoenaker
 33  Alicia Soffel
 29  Lucie-Marie Kretzschmar	
CB
 17  Lisa Friedberger
 26  Sarah van Gulik
RB
 6  Leonie Kockel
 32  Neele Orth
 58  Lilli Holste

Transfers 
Transfers for the 2023–24 season

 Joining
  Kim Naidzinavicius (CB) (from  SG BBM Bietigheim)

 Leaving
  Lotta Heider (RW)

References

External links
 Official site

 

German handball clubs
Handball clubs established in 1997
Sport in Hesse